The Thomson MO6 was a Motorola 6809E-based computer introduced in France in 1986. It was intended as the successor to the Thomson MO5 and featured 128 KB of RAM, a 40×25 text display, and a new built-in Microsoft BASIC interpreter (BASIC 128). It retained compatibility with its predecessor, while incorporating the same technology as the TO8. 

Graphic abilities were expanded compared to the MO5, by the use of the Thomson EF9369 graphics chip. The 16 colour palette could be defined from a total of 4096 and extra video modes were available:   
320 x 200 x 16 colours (2 colour per 8x1 pixels restraint)
640 x 200 x 2 colours
320 x 200 x 4 colours (no restraints)
160 x 200 x 16 colours (no restraints)
320 x 200 x 3 colours and one transparency level
320 x 200 x 2 colours (allows shifting between two screen pages)
160 x 200 x 5 colours with 3 transparency levels

In Italy it was sold by Olivetti with little aesthetic changes, and named Olivetti Prodest PC128.  

21 games were released for the MO6. The machine was available until January 1989.

Bibliography

References

External links
DCMOTO: PC emulator for Thomson MO5, MO5E, MO5NR, MO6, T9000, TO7, TO7/70, TO8, TO8D, TO9, TO9+ and Olivetti Prodest PC128. Comprehensive software and documentation are also available.

Personal computers
6809-based home computers
Thomson computers